A limner is an illuminator of manuscripts, or more generally, a painter of ornamental decoration. One of the earliest mentions of a limner's work is found in the book Methods and Materials of Painting by Charles Lock Eastlake (1793–1865).

United Kingdom
In London in the mid-19th century the limner David Laurent de Lara established himself as a modern illuminator of manuscripts and documents. His work broke new ground and helped establish the idea of illumination as a contemporary artform in its own right, rather than as a historical artform.

The office of Her Majesty's Painter and Limner is a position within the Royal Household unique to Scotland. It is currently held by Dame Elizabeth Blackadder. The position of portrait painter to the royal household is honorary and for life.

United States
In early 19th-century America, a limner artist was one who had little if any formal training and would travel from place to place to solicit commissions.

Among colonial America's rising mercantile class, a limner was an unattributed portrait commissioned as a status symbol. The local landowners and merchants who commissioned these portraits posed in their finest clothes, in well-appointed interiors, or in landscapes that identified their position, property, good taste, and sophistication.

A late named artist who began in this genre is the Maine landscape artist Charles Codman, who in Eastern Argus (April 1, 1831) is described as an "ornamental and sign painter" or "limner" who practiced "Military, Standard, Fancy, Ornamental, Masonic and Sign Painting".

Canada
The Victoria Limners Society was a group of artists working in Victoria, British Columbia from 1971 through 2008. They worked within a variety of artistic styles and mediums, such as painting, sculpting, pottery, and other forms of visual art. The artists include Maxwell Bates, Pat Martin Bates, Richard Ciccimarra, Robert De Castro, Colin Graham, Helga Grove, Jan Grove, Elza Mayhew, Myfanwy Pavelic, Carole Sabiston, Herbert Siebner, Robin Skelton, and Karl Spreitz.

References

External links
 Works of the Gansevoort Limner at the National Gallery of Art
 Works of the Freake Limner at the Fine Arts Museums of San Francisco
 Portrait by Erastus Salisbury Field at the Portland Art Museum

Obsolete occupations
Arts occupations